Flem Galloway House is a historic home and national historic district located near Calvert, Transylvania County, North Carolina.  It was built in 1878, and is a two-story, heavy timber frame I-house, with a two-story rear ell.  It is sheathed in weatherboard and has a gable roof. The front facade features a two-tiered, center-bay, cross-gabled porch.  Also on the property is a contributing -story smokehouse.

It was listed on the National Register of Historic Places in 1995.

References

Houses on the National Register of Historic Places in North Carolina
Historic districts on the National Register of Historic Places in North Carolina
Houses completed in 1878
Houses in Transylvania County, North Carolina
National Register of Historic Places in Transylvania County, North Carolina